Theodoros Galanis (born 14 July 1980) is a Greek footballer. He played for the Cypriot Cup winners, APOP Kinyras Peyias. He started his career from Panetolikos and also played for Panargiakos and Ethnikos Asteras. From 2006 to 2010, he was under contract with APOP Kinyras Peyias, with which he celebrated his first and only title, the Cypriot Cup 2008–09.

Honours
APOP Kinyras
 Cypriot Cup: 2008–09

References

External links
Profile at cfa.com.cy

1980 births
Living people
Greek footballers
Footballers from Argos, Peloponnese
Greek expatriate footballers
Cypriot First Division players
Ethnikos Asteras F.C. players
APOP Kinyras FC players
Panetolikos F.C. players
Expatriate footballers in Cyprus
Association football defenders
20th-century Greek people
21st-century Greek people